An election to Ceredigion County Council were held on 4 May 2017 when local elections took place across Wales. It was preceded by the 2012 election and the next election is scheduled to take place in 2022.

Summary of results
Plaid Cymru remained the largest party on 5 May 2017, but fell short of an overall majority with 19 councillors. However, James Wyn Reynolds Thomas (Plaid Cymru) was elected unopposed on 11 May 2017 for the Llandyfriog ward, bringing the number of Plaid councillors on the Council up to 20. Eight seats, out of the 42 available, had candidates elected unopposed.

|-bgcolor=#F6F6F6
| colspan=2 style="text-align: right; margin-right: 1em" | Total
| style="text-align: right;" | 42
| colspan=5 |
| style="text-align: right;" | 23,690
| style="text-align: right;" | 
|-
|}

Background
The 2012 elections saw Plaid Cymru win 19 seats, independents 15 seats, Liberal Democrats 7 seats and the Labour Party one seat, leaving the council in no overall control, with Plaid Cymru three seats short of a majority. After the election the Independents agreed to work with Plaid Cymru, as did the sole Labour councillor, creating a coalition.

During the term Gethin James (Ind, Aberporth) joined UKIP but said that he would still sit in the Cabinet. This was strongly opposed by both the leader of the council Ellen ap Gwynn (Plaid, Ceulanamaesmawr) and by the leader of Plaid Cymru, Leanne Wood. He eventually resigned from his cabinet post and sat on the opposition benches with the Liberal Democrats; and lost his Aberporth seat in the 2017 election.

At the close of nominations on 4 April 2017, the numbers of candidates nominated were as follows: Plaid Cymru 35, Independents 27, Liberal Democrats 22, Labour Party 9, Green Party 5, Conservatives 3, National Health Action Party 1.

Ward Results
Asterisks denote incumbent Councillors seeking re-election.
Vote share changes compared with corresponding 2012 election.

Aberaeron ward

Aberporth

Aberystwyth, Bronglais ward

Aberystwyth, Central ward

Aberystwyth, North ward

Aberystwyth, Penparcau ward
Cllr. Jones-Southgate was elected as a Plaid Cymru councillor for this ward in 2012 but subsequently became an Independent. She stood for the Liberal Democrats in the Llanfarian ward in 2008.

Aberystwyth, Rheidol ward

Beulah ward

Borth ward

Capel Dewi ward

 The election in 2017 was a repeat of the 2012 elections (with both candidates being re-nominated)

Cardigan, Mwldan ward

Cardigan, Rhydyfuwch ward

 Cllr. Mark Cole announced his intention to stand down from the council at these elections on 4 April, the last day for nominations

Cardigan, Teifi ward

 This is a repeat of the 2012 election (with both parties re-nominating the same candidates)

Ceulanamaesmawr ward

 Cllr. ap Gwynn became leader of the council after the 2012 elections.

Ciliau Aeron ward

 Sonia Williams was the Liberal Democrat candidate in the 2012 elections.

Faenor ward

Lampeter ward

Llanarth ward

Llanbadarn Fawr, Padarn ward

Llanbadarn Fawr, Sulien ward

Llandyfriog ward
Two candidates were nominated for this ward, Neil Flower (Liberal Democrat) and James Wyn Reynolds Thomas (Plaid Cymru). On 28 April 2017 it was announced that Neil Flower had died. Following normal convention the election in this ward was cancelled and a new election was due to be held on 8 June 2017.
 However, James Wyn Reynolds Thomas was elected County Councillor for the ward without a contest.

Llandysiliogogo ward

Llandysul Town ward
Here, Keith Evans regained the seat he lost four year previously.

Llanfarian ward

Llanfihangel Ystrad ward

Llangeitho ward

Llangybi ward

Llanrhystud ward

Llansantffraed ward

 Harry Hayfield was the Liberal Democrat candidate for this ward in the 2012 elections.

Llanwenog ward

Lledrod ward

Melindwr ward

New Quay ward

Penbryn ward

Penparc ward

Tirymynach ward

Trefeurig ward

Tregaron ward

Troedyraur ward
The winning candidate ran as an independent in 2012.

Ystwyth ward

By-elections 2017-2021

Llanbadarn Fawr, Sulien ward (2019)
A by-election was held in this ward on 18 July 2019 following the death of Cllr. James in a cycling accident. The result of the by-election was:

Notes

References

2017
2017 Welsh local elections
21st century in Ceredigion